Ma Ming (born October 1957) is a former Chinese politician who spent his career in northeast China's Jilin province and the nearby  Inner Mongolia Autonomous Region. He was investigated by the Communist Party of China's anti-graft agency in December 2019. Previously he served as vice chairman of the Inner Mongolia Autonomous Region Committee of the Chinese People's Political Consultative Conference.

Early life and education
Ma was born in Liaozhong County, Liaoning in October 1957. From July 1975 to August 1978, he was a sent down youth in Mishazi Commune of Dehui County, Jilin Province. After the resumption of college entrance examination,  he was accepted to Jilin College of Finance and Trade (now Jilin University of Finance and Economics), where he graduated in August 1982.

Career
After graduation, he was assigned to Jilin Institute of Financial Science, becoming its vice president in March 1987. From June 1994 to  August 1995, he was deputy Communist Party secretary of Changling County. He was deputy head of Jilin Provincial State Owned Assets Administration (1995–1996), Jilin Provincial Department of Finance (1996–1998), and Jilin Provincial Department of Foreign Trade and Economic Cooperation (1998–2000). He was vice mayor of Songyuan County in May 2000, and held that office until December 2002. In December 2003 he was promoted to become deputy head of Jilin Provincial Department of Finance, a position he held until January 2006. In January 2006, he was appointed head of the Jilin Provincial Department of Commerce, a position he remained in until January 2008, when he was transferred to Liaoyuan and appointed Communist Party secretary. He became the Communist Party secretary and head of Jilin Provincial Public Security Department in May 2011, and served until June 2012. He concurrently served as vice governor of Jilin from January 2012 to June 2012.

In June 2012, he was transferred to Hohhot, capital of Inner Mongolia Autonomous Region, as vice chairman of the People's Government of Inner Mongolia Autonomous Region, Communist Party secretary and head of the Public Security Department of Inner Mongolia Autonomous Region, and deputy secretary of the Politics and Law Commission of Inner Mongolia Autonomous Region. In February 2018, he was appointed vice chairman of the Inner Mongolia Autonomous Region Committee of the Chinese People's Political Consultative Conference.

Downfall
On December 1, 2019, Ma was placed under investigation for serious violations of laws and regulations by the Central Commission for Discipline Inspection (CCDI), the party's internal disciplinary body, and the National Supervisory Commission, the highest anti-corruption agency of China. On November 15, 2020, he was expelled from the Communist Party of China and removed from public office. Prosecutors signed an arrest order for him on December 1.

On January 12, 2021, he has been indicted on suspicion of accepting bribes.

References

1957 births
Jilin University of Finance and Economics alumni
Living people
People's Republic of China politicians from Liaoning
Chinese Communist Party politicians from Liaoning